Mulloon is a locality in the Queanbeyan-Palerang Region, Southern Tablelands, New South Wales, Australia.

Mulloon lies generally to the south of the Kings Highway between Bungendore and Braidwood on both sides of Mulloon Creek, a tributary of Reedy Creek, which flows into the Shoalhaven River. The high ground along the western edge of the Mulloon Creek catchment is part of the crest of the Great Dividing Range.

The area now known as Mulloon lies close to the boundaries of the traditional lands of the Ngarigo people, to the west, and the Walbanga people, a group of the Yuin, to the east.

Mulloon had a public school from 1872 to 1886, which operated "half-time". Its "half time" partner school was Ingledow School.

In recent years, the Mulloon Creek catchment has become well known, as the location of projects to revive watercourses and  eroded and degraded land. The work began with a demonstration project in 2006, on 3 km of Mulloon Creek at Mulloon. It is now being scaled up to involve around twenty landholders within the catchment, covering 23,000 hectares and 50 km of watercourses.

References

External links

 Stream and rehabilitation projects in the Mulloon Creek catchment

Queanbeyan–Palerang Regional Council
Localities in New South Wales
Southern Tablelands